Island council elections were held in the Netherlands Antilles in 1955. They were the second elections for the Island Council.

Aruba

Three parties participated, which had participated in 1951; the Aruban Patriotic Party, Aruban People's Party and Aruba National Union (which had been two parties in the 1951 elections; UNA-I and UNA-II).

Results

Sint Maarten

The result was a victory for the Democratic Party, which won four of the five Island Council seats.

Results

References

General election
Netherlands Antilles island council
Elections in Aruba